The British Rail Class 414 (or 2 HAP) were two-car electric multiple units that were built between 1956 and 1963. They were withdrawn in 1995.

History
The class formed part of the Southern Region's express fleet, and were fitted with the standard  express gear ratio, for such units. This was primarily because a number of their duties involved working in multiple with the 4 CEP Express fleet, also of 90 mph maximum speed. Three batches (209 units) were built.

The first batch of thirty-six units was built on the reclaimed underframes of older 2 NOL units, to the old SR-style Bulleid design and numbered in the range 5601–5636. These units had the formation Driving Motor Brake Open Second (DMBSO) + Driving Trailer Composite with lavatory (DTCK). In 1969, the first class seating in 12 units was downgraded in the DTCKL, becoming DTSK. The units were then reclassified as 2-SAP. First class was restored in 1970 and they regained their former identities. All were withdrawn by 1982, with the DMBSO getting refurbished and integrated into the class 415 refurbishment programme. The DTSKs were scrapped.

The second and third batches of units, numbered 6001–6042 and 6043–6173 respectively, were formed DMBSO + DTCsoL, as opposed to the earlier DTCK, and were built to the newer standard Mark 1 coach profile. The DMBSO vehicles were to Diagram 400, the same as in the BR-designed Southern Region 2 EPB units, and orders in the second batch consisted of vehicles for both unit types. From 1974, 51 units had their first class accommodation downgraded to second class. They were also reclassified as 2-SAP and renumbered 5901–5951. They were converted back to their original configuration in 1980 (with the exception of one disbanded in 1978 due to accident damage) when many of these two later batches of units were reformed to class 413/2 and 413/3 4-CAP units. 5951 was again converted back to a 2-SAP in 1982.

With the introduction of yellow warning panels from late 1963 the motor coaches of all Southern Region 2 and 3-car units were equipped with an inverted black triangle in order to provide an early visual indication to station staff that there was no brake van at the other end of the unit. As units such the 4 CAP stock had a brake van at each end of the unit they were not so equipped.

In compliance with the TOPS numbering system, surviving units from the range 6001–6042 were renumbered into the 42xx series (class 414/2); the surviving units of 6043–6173 became 43xx (class 414/3).

Withdrawals of the class began in 1982 and modernisation of the units began in 1983, when 10 DMBSO from withdrawn units were converted for use on the Gatwick Express service in conjunction with converted loco-hauled Open First (FO) and Open Second (SO) vehicles and class 73 locomotives.

Accidents and incidents
One person was killed and ten were injured.

Preservation
Two complete units have been preserved; (with a further four driving motor coaches, see ):

References

Sources

Further reading

414
Train-related introductions in 1956
750 V DC multiple units